Tim Sims (1962 – February 2, 1995) was a Canadian actor and comedian.

He is known for his roles as Jack the Cave Man on The Red Green Show and as Circle Researcher Rory Tate in a series of Reese's Peanut Butter Cup commercials in the 1990s. He also performed sketch comedy with The Second City.

Sims died at the age of 33 from AIDS-related causes. The Tim Sims Encouragement Fund Award and Tim Sims Playhouse, a Toronto venue used by The Second City, are both named in his honour.

Tim Sims Encouragement Fund Award
The Tim Sims Encouragement Fund Award is an annual award given to Canada's "most promising new comedy act". It was established by Sims' widow, comic actor Lindsay Leese. From 1996 to 2015, the Award is given annually as part of the Cream of Comedy showcase at The Second City, which features performances by that year's five finalists and which was televised by The Comedy Network until the final few years. In 2015, the 20th and final Cream of Comedy showcase (CoC20) took place at Toronto's Second City, featuring performances by many previous winners and nominees.

Since 2016 two Tim Sims Awards have been given out annually, one to a Second City Training Centre Conservatory Program Graduate, and another to a student of the Comedy Writing and Performance Program at Humber College.

Winners

1996-2015
1996 – Jason Thompson: "Horror Clown"
1997 – Fast & Dirty (Gord Oxley & Rob Hawke)
1998 – Gavin Crawford
1999 – Fraser Young
2000 – Laurie Elliot
2001 – Levi Macdougall
2002* – Brad Hart & Tim Polley
2003 – Ron Sparks
2004 – Katie Crown
2005 – Jeff McEnery
2006 – Nathan Fielder
2007 – Nathan MacIntosh
2008 – 7 Minutes in Heaven (Josh Saltzman & Laura Cilevitz)
2009 – Calvin Storoschuk
2010 - Mike Rita
2011 - British Teeth (Filip Jeremic & Allana Reoch)
2012 - Christi Olson
2013 - Nigel Grinstead
2014 - Caitlin Langelier
*in 2002 Hart and Polley tied for the award after the jury became hopelessly deadlocked; a new rule was made that Lindsay Leese would receive a tie-break in future years, if necessary, to avoid the same problem.

2015-present

Humber College Comedy Program students
2015 - Meg MacKay
2016 - Robbie Woods
2017 - Jordanne Brown

Second City Training Centre Conservatory Program graduates
2015 - Carolina Zoccoli
2016 - Cameron LaPrairie
2017 - Tom Hearn
2018 - Ophira Calof

References

External links
 
 Eye Weekly (October 28, 1993): Review of "Fun With Tim Sims And Friends"

1962 births
1995 deaths
Canadian male television actors
Canadian male comedians
AIDS-related deaths in Canada
20th-century Canadian male actors
20th-century Canadian comedians